ODQ or Odq may refer to:
Odq, Zero–direct–quadrature
ODQ, Ordre des dentistes du Québec
The Oxford Dictionary of Quotations
1H-(1,2,4)Oxadiazolo(4,3-a)quinoxalin-1-one, an inhibitor of nitric oxide receptor soluble guanylyl cyclase